Kundadam is a small town located in Dharapuram taluk of Tiruppur district in Indian state of Tamil Nadu. It is the headquarters of the Kundadam Panchayat Union in Tiruppur district. It is located 16Km away from Dharapuram in Coimbatore-Dharapuram highway. In the classical Tamil texts, this town is named as Kundrai, Kundrapuram, Kundrai Managar and Kundridam. The town houses famous temples including Varatharājaperumāl Temple, Kala Bairavar Temple, Kongu Vatuganādha Swāmy Temple, Koṅgar Chinnamman Temple and Vadivudaimangai Udanurai Konguvidangkisuvarar Temple.

Economy 
Kundadam's economy is based on Agriculture.Coconut is the major part of cultivation in Kundadam and also one of the large supplier of Onion to nearby districts. Being proximer to Tiruppur, it also houses some Textile based industries.

Administration and politics 
Kundadam was a part of Coimbatore district and later Erode district and now Tiruppur district. Kundadam comes under Dharapuram taluk, Tiruppur district and headquarters of Kundadam block. It falls under Dharapuram state assembly constituency and Erode Lok Sabha constituency.

AIADMK, DMK and BJP are the major political parties in this area.

This town also houses a police station. Kundadam also has also got a Cattle market.

Connectivity 
Nearby Bus terminal is Dharapuram city bus terminal. There are buses available 24/7 to Coimbatore, Dharapuram, Palladam, Tiruppur, Madurai, Oddanchatram,and Dindigul. It is also connected to nearby towns like Kangeyam, Uthiyur, SuriyaNallur, Koduvai and AvinashiPalayam via town buses. Nearby Railway station is Tiruppur railway station and nearby airport is Coimbatore International Airport.

See also 

 Dharapuram
 Tiruppur
 Uthiyur

References 

Cities and towns in Tiruppur district